Oyo State is an inland state in southwestern Nigeria. Its capital is Ibadan, the third most populous city in the country and formerly the second most populous city in Africa. Oyo State is bordered to the north by Kwara State, to the east by Osun State, and to the southwest by Ogun State and the Republic of Benin. With a projected population of 7,840,864 in 2016, Oyo State is the fifth most populous in the Nigeria.

The vast majority of Oyo State residents are Yoruba, and the Yoruba language remains dominant. Nicknamed the "Pace Setter State", present-day Oyo State sits on territory formerly ruled by various kingdoms and empires.

The Oyo Empire was a powerful Yoruba empire that ruled in much of the area from c. 1300 to 1896. Built in the 1830s, modern city of Oyo is considered a remnant of the imperial era, being referred to as "New Ọyọ" (Ọ̀yọ́ Àtìbà) to distinguish itself from the former capital to the north, 'Old Oyo' (Ọ̀yọ́-Ilé). The Alaafin of Oyo continues to serve a ceremonial role in the city.

Oyo State is noted for being the site of the first university in Nigeria, the University of Ibadan, founded in 1948. The state economy remains largely agrarian, with the western city of Shaki being described as the state's breadbasket. cassava, cocoa, and tobacco are among the most important crops to Oyo State's economy.

Geography

Oyo State covers approximately an area of 28,454 square kilometers and is ranked 14th by size. The landscape consists of old hard rocks and dome shaped hills, which rise gently from about 500 meters in the southern part and reaching a height of about 1,200 metres above sea level in the northern part. Some principal rivers such as Ogun, Oba, Oyan, Otin, Ofiki, Sasa, Oni, Erinle and Osun river originate in this highland.

Oyo State contains a number of natural features including the Old Oyo National Park. In this location there was earlier habitat for the endangered African wild dog, Lycaon pictus; however, this canid is thought to have been locally extirpated at the present.

The climate is equatorial, notably with dry and wet seasons with relatively high humidity. The dry season lasts from November to March while the wet season starts from April and ends in October.

History
It was formed in 1976 from Western State, and included Ọsun State, which was split off in 1991. Oyo State is homogenous, mainly inhabited by the Yoruba ethnic group who are primarily agrarian but have a predilection for living in high-density urban centres. The indigenes mainly comprise the Oyos, the Oke-Oguns, the Ibadans and the Ibarapas, all belonging to the Yoruba family and indigenous city in Africa. Ibadan had been the centre of administration of the old Western Region since the days of British colonial rule.

Other notable cities and towns in Ọyọ State include Ọyọ, Ogbomọsọ, Ibadan, Isẹyín-Okeogun, Ipapo-Okeogun, Kíṣì-Okeogun, Okeho-Okeogun, Saki-Okeogun, Igbeti-Okeogun, Eruwa-Ibarapa, Iroko, Lanlate, OjeOwode-Okeogun, Sepeteri-Okeogun, Ilora-Oyo, Jobele-Oyo, Awe-Oyo, Ilérò-Okeogun, Okaka-Okeogun, Igbo Ora-Ibarapa, Idere

Records and landmarks

The first degree awarding institution in Nigeria is the University of Ibadan (established as a college of the University of London when it was founded in 1948, and later converted into an autonomous university in 1962). The other universities in the state are: Lead City University, Ibadan, Ajayi Crowther University, Oyo, Koladaisi University, Dominican University, Ibadan, Dominion University and Ladoke Akintola University of Technology, Ogbomoso. The Polytechnic, Ibadan, Oyo State College of Agriculture and Technology Igbo Ora, Adeseun Ogundoyin Polytechnic Eruwa are located in Oyo State.

There are 324 secondary schools and 1,576 public primary schools in the state. Other noteworthy institutions in the city include the University College Hospital, Ibadan; the first teaching hospital in Nigeria and the International Institute of Tropical Agriculture (lITA). Cocoa House, located in Ibadan, was the first skyscraper built in Africa.

The state is home to NTA Ibadan, the first television station in Africa, and the Obafemi Awolowo (formerly, Liberty) Stadium, a stadium with a capacity of 35,000.

Other major tourist attractions located in the state include: Agodi Botanical Garden, Ado-Awaye Suspended lake, Mapo Hall, University of Ibadan Zoological Garden, Ido Cenotaph, Trans-Wonderland Amusement Park, Old Oyo National Park located in the historical site of the ancient capital of the famous old Oyo Empire, Iyamopo and Agbele Hill in Igbeti, Bowers Tower and the Cultural Centre, Mokola. The state hosts the first FM radio, and the first private television station, Galaxy Television (Nigeria) in the country.

Government and politics 
Under the Nigerian 1999 constitution the government of Oyo State, and those of the other 35 Nigerian States, is divided into three branches to be in line with the government of the Federal Republic of Nigeria which is also three tier: the executive branch, the legislative branch and the judiciary.  The executive branch of Oyo State government is headed by an elected executive governor who presides over the State Executive Council made up of appointed cabinet members. The present governor of Oyo State is Oluseyi Abiodun Makinde with Rauf Olaniyan as deputy governor. The legislative branch is headed by an elected Speaker of the House of Assembly. The current Speaker is Hon. Debo Ogundoyin. And lastly, the judiciary is headed by the Chief Judge of Oyo State High Court. The present Chief Judge of the state is Muktar Abimbola.

Education
Presently the State has 2,004 public schools, 971 private nursery/primary schools, 969 public secondary schools including 7 schools of Science and 57 private secondary schools. Also in the State, there are five government technical colleges at Oyo, Ogbomoso, Ibadan, Shaki-Okeogun and Iseyin-Okeogun with enrolment of 2,829 students in the 2000/2001 academic session. The National Youth Service Corp(NYSC) permanent orientation camp is located in Iseyin.

There is Ebedi Writers’ Residency situated at the hill-side of Barracks area of Iseyin . This International Residency has brought great writers, journalists and authors all over the world including Africa's first Nobel Laurel, Prof. Wole Soyinka, Jumoke Verissiomo, Funmi Aluko, Richard Ali, Paul Liam and others.

Historically prominent secondary schools include St Anne's School Ibadan (1869), Wesley College, Ibadan (1905), Ibadan Grammar School (1913), Government College Ibadan (1927), St Theresa's College Ibadan (1932), Ibadan Boys' High School (1938), Olivet Heights Oyo (1945), Queen's School Ibadan (1952), Loyola College Ibadan (1954), St. Bernadine's Oyo (1957),  Lagelu Grammar School Ibadan (1958), Iseyin District Grammar School Iseyin (1964), Methodist High School, Ibadan (1961) St Patrick's Grammar School Ibadan (1962) and several others. It's also home to Africa's leading fountain of knowledge, the iconic University of Ibadan (The university was originally instituted as an independent external college of the University of London, then it was called the University College, Ibadan).

Two new technical colleges located at Iseyin, Iseyin Local Government area and Ikija in Oluyole Local Government area were established in the 2001/2002 academic session. A college of education, Oyo State College of Education, Oyo. There is a Polytechnic, The Polytechnic, Ibadan, with 2 satellite campuses at Eruwa and Shaki-Okeogun, (now known as The Oke-Ogun Polytechnic) and a State-owned University, The Ladoke Akintola University of Technology (LAUTECH), Ogbomoso, which is jointly owned by Oyo and Osun State Governments. The federal premier university The University of Ibadan, is also located in State capital. A private Polytechnic (SAF Polytechnic, Iseyin) is located in Iseyin. There is a vocational Institute in Saki West Local Government named: The Kings Poly, Shaki-Okeogun.

There are also the Federal College of Animal Health and Production Technology, Ibadan; Federal College of Education (Special), Oyo, the Federal School of Surveying, Oyo; Cocoa Research Institute of Nigeria (CRIN), Institute of Agricultural Research and Training (IAR&T), the Nigerian Institute of Science Laboratory Technology (NISLT), the Federal College of Forestry, Ibadan (FEDCOFOR) a subsidiary of Forestry Research Institute of Nigeria (FRIN) and the Nigerian Institute Of Social And Economic Research (NISER), all in Ibadan.

Similarly, there are 15 Nomadic schools in the State. They are Gaa Jooro and Gaa Baale, both in Kisi (Irepo Local Government); Baochilu Government; Arin-Oye, Abiogun, Okaka and Baba-Ode (Itesiwaju Local Government); Iganna (Iwajowa Local Government); Igangan and Ayete (Ibarapa North Local Government); Gaa Kondo and Igbo-Ora, (Ibarapa Central Local Government) and Sepeteri (Saki East Local Government). There are 213 continuing education centres spread all over the State.

15 special primary schools and 8 special units in secondary schools cater for handicapped children. There are 11,732 teaching staff in the state public secondary schools and 2,789 non-teaching staff.

The Agency for Adult and Non-formal Education (AANFE) caters for illiterate adults who had no opportunity of formal education. The agency has 455 classes in existence in the 33 Local Government areas of the State, while 200,000 illiterate adults and over 80,000 post-illiterate adults have been trained recently.

List of universities
The following are universities located within Oyo State;
 University of Ibadan, Ibadan
 Ladoke Akintola University of Technology, Ogbomoso
 Lead City University, Ibadan
 Dominican University, Ibadan
 Ajayi Crowther University, Oyo
 Koladaisi University
 Oyo State Technical University, Ibadan, Oyo State
 Àtìbà University|Àtìbà University, Ọ̀yọ́

List of polytechnics
 The Polytechnic, Ibadan
 Adeseun Ogundoyin Polytechnic, Eruwa
 The Oke-Ogun Polytechnic
 Federal Polytechnic Ayede, Ogbomoso

List of specialized tertiary institutions 
 Federal School of Surveying, Oyo
 Federal College of Forestry, Ibadan
 Federal College of Agriculture, Ibadan
 Federal Cooperative College, Ibadan
 Federal School of Statistics, Ibadan

List of colleges 

 Federal College of Education (Special), Oyo
 Federal College of Animal Health and Production Technology, Moor plantation Ibadan (FCAHPT)
 Federal College of Agriculture Ibadan
 Emmanuel Alayande College of Education
 Oyo State College of Agriculture and Technology, Igbo-Ora
 Oyo State College Of Nursing and Midwifery, Eleyele, Ibadan
 Oyo State College of Health Science and Technology,  Eleyele, Ibadan
 The College of Education, Lanlate.

List of registered private polytechnics
 The Kings Polytechnic, Saki
 SAF Polytechnic, Iseyin
 City Polytechnic, Ibadan
 Tower Polytechnic, Ibadan
 Bolmor Polytechnic, Ibadan

List of current public officials

Agriculture
Agriculture is the main occupation of the people of Oyo State. The climate in the state favours the cultivation of crops like maize, yam, cassava, millet, rice, plantains, cocoa, palm produce, cashew etc. There are a number of government farm settlements in Iseyin/Ipapo, Ilora, Eruwa, Ogbomosho, Iresaadu, Ijaiye, Akufo and Lalupon. There is abundance of clay, kaolin and aquamarine. There are also vast cattle ranches at Saki, Fasola and Ibadan, a dairy farm at Monatan in Ibadan and the statewide Oyo State Agricultural Development Programme with headquarters at Saki. A number of international and federal agricultural establishments are located in the state.

Local Government Areas

Oyo State consists of 33 Local Government Areas. They are:

 Afijio Jobele 
 Akinyele Moniya
 Atiba Ofa Meta
 Atisbo  Tede-Okeogun
 Egbeda Egbeda
 Ibadan North Agodi Gate
 Ibadan North-East Iwo Road
 Ibadan North-West Dugbe/Onireke
 Ibadan South-East Mapo
 Ibadan South-West Ring Road
 Ibarapa Central Igbo Ora 
 Ibarapa East Eruwa
 Ibarapa North Ayete
 Ido Ido
 Irepo Kisi-Okeogun
 Iseyin Iseyin-Okeogun
 Itesiwaju Otu-Okeogun
 Iwajowa Iwereile-Okeogun
 Kajola Okeho-Okeogun
 Lagelu Iyanaofa
 Ogbomosho North Ogbomoso 
 Ogbomosho South Arowomole
 Ogo Oluwa Ajawa
 Olorunsogo Igbeti-Okeogun
 Oluyole Idi Ayunre
 Ona Ara Akanran
 Orelope Igboho-Okeogun
 Ori Ire Ikoyi
 Oyo East Kosobo 
 Oyo West Ojongbodu
 Saki East Agoamodu-Okeogun
 Saki West Shaki-Okeogun 
 Surulere Iresa Adu

Notable people 
 

 9ice (born Alexander Abolore Adegbola Akande, on 17 January 1980), musician
 Wande Abimbola, retired academic, religious leader and politician
 Joseph Adebayo Adelakun, evangelist
 Lamidi Adedibu, aristocratic power broker
Benjamin Adekunle, general
Akinwumi Adesina, President African Development Bank, AfDB
Lam Adesina, former Governor Oyo State (1999–2003), Leader of the Action Congress of Nigeria.
Otunba (Dr) Christopher Alao-Akala, former Governor of Oyo State (2007-2011)]
Senator Abiola Ajimobi, former Governor of Oyo State (2011-2019)
Oba Lamidi Adeyemi III, Alaafin of Oyo
Oba Saliu Adetunji, the 41st Olubadan of Ibadan land
Olaniyi Afonja, actor and comedian
Benjamin Akande, academic
Richard Akinjide, lawyer and politician
Oluyombo Awojobi, rural surgeon
Ladoke Akintola, politician, lawyer and orator
Quadri Aruna, table tennis player 
Adebayo Johnson Bankole, politician
 Sikiru Ayinde Barrister, musician
Abdulfatai Buhari, senator
Samuel Ajayi Crowther, priest and historian
Sunday Akin Dare, journalist and politician 
Adebayo Faleti, actor, poet and writer
Toyin Falola, historian and academic
Tade Ipadeola, poet
Samuel Johnson, historian
Senator Rasheed Ladoja, former Governor of Oyo State (2003–2007)
Kase Lukman Lawal, businessman
Abass Akande Obesere, Fuji musician and entertainer
 Chief Akinpelu Obisesan, diarist, and founder of Cooperative Bank
Latunde Odeku, medical doctor, teacher and poet
Professor Dibu Ojerinde, former registrar, Joint Matriculation Board of Nigeria
Tunji Olaopa, founder and executive vice chairman, ISGPP
Oba Olasunkanmi Abioye Opeola, Kurunloju I, Oniroko of Iroko
 Saheed Osupa, Fuji and Hip-Pop artist
David Oyelowo, actor 
Afeez Oyetoro, actor, comedian and Academic
Sade, R&B/Soul artist, born in Oyo State
 Senator (Rt. Hon.) Monsurat Sunmonu, first female Speaker OYHA and first female Senator from Oyo state
Ibrahim Taiwo, general and politician
Bode Thomas, politician and Lawyer

Politics
The state government is led by a democratical elected governor who works closely with members of the state's house of assembly. The capital city of the state is Ibadan.

Electoral system
The governor of each state is selected using a modified two-round system. To be elected in the first round, a candidate must receive the plurality of the vote and over 25% of the vote in at least two -third of the State local government Areas. If no candidate passes threshold, a second round will be held between the top candidate and the next candidate to have received a plurality of votes in the highest number of local government Areas.

References

External links 

 Oyo State Government Homepage
  Oyo Begins Oral Interview For 7,000 TESCOM Applicants - NaijaNews247

 
States of Nigeria
States in Yorubaland
States and territories established in 1976
1976 establishments in Nigeria